Evgeny Alexandrovich Ryasensky (born July 18, 1987), or Yevgeni Ryasenski, is a Russian professional ice hockey defenseman. He is currently an unrestricted free agent who most recently played with Neftekhimik Nizhnekamsk of the Kontinental Hockey League (KHL).

Playing career
Ryasensky made his senior debut in the Russian Superleague with Ak Bars Kazan before transferring to Neftekhimik Nizhnekamsk for the inaugural season of the KHL in 2008-09 season. Over the next six seasons Ryasensky spent time also with HC CSKA Moscow and SKA Saint Petersburg.

In the 2014–15 season, Ryasensky was traded by SKA Saint Petersburg along with Alexei Grishin and Mikhail Tikhonov in a return to Neftekhimik Nizhnekamsk in exchange for Nikolai Belov and a first-round pick on November 24, 2014. On November 24, 2015 on the initiative of the player, the club terminated the contract.

On December 21, 2015, Ryasensky signed a contract in a return with Neftekhimik Nizhnekamsk before the end of the season.

After three further seasons with Neftekhimik, Ryasensky left as a free agent to join his fifth KHL club, Traktor Chelyabinsk, on September 25, 2017.

Career statistics

International

References

External links

1987 births
Living people
Ak Bars Kazan players
HC CSKA Moscow players
HC Neftekhimik Nizhnekamsk players
Russian ice hockey defencemen
Sportspeople from Tver
SKA Saint Petersburg players
Traktor Chelyabinsk players